South Tabor is a neighborhood in southeastern Portland, Oregon in the United States. The neighborhood is bounded by SE Division, Powell, 52nd, and 82nd Avenues. Its neighborhood association is a member of the Southeast Uplift coalition, which serves as its link to Portland's Office of Neighborhood Involvement.

South Tabor is named for its proximity to Mount Tabor, an extinct volcano and one of Portland's more popular parks.

South Tabor is largely residential; all of the neighborhood's businesses are situated on the streets that form its boundaries. 

South Tabor is currently occupying the land of the 
Confederated Tribes of Grand Ronde.

Two of Portland's three most dangerous intersections are at the easternmost corners of the neighborhood: SE Powell and 82nd, and SE Division and 82nd.

Franklin High School, Atkinson Elementary, Kellogg Middle School (currently closed), St. Mark's Lutheran Church, and Trinity Fellowship Church are in South Tabor. South Tabor is also home to a gathering place built by the City Repair Project, a local nonprofit organization, which includes a cob pizza oven and community bulletin board. There is also a meditation labyrinth in a private yard, but often open free of charge to the general public.

The eastern portion of the neighborhood includes the Jade District commercial and cultural center.

References

External links
 

Guide to South Tabor Neighborhood (PortlandNeighborhood.com)
South Tabor Street Tree Inventory Report

 
Neighborhoods in Portland, Oregon